Zhang Xiaohuan (born August 19, 1980) is a Chinese former synchronized swimmer. Her career on the Chinese national team lasted from 1997 to 2009, during which she participated in six FINA World Aquatics Championships. She also competed in the 2000 Summer Olympics, the 2004 Summer Olympics, and the 2008 Summer Olympics, winning a bronze medal in 2008. 

Zhang Xiaohuan retired right after the 2009 World Aquatics Championships, and immediately became one of the two head coaches of the Chinese national team. She and fellow rookie coach Wang Na guided Team China to three golds at the 2010 Asian Games. In 2011, she and Masayo Imura (who replaced Wang Na) took Team China to new heights at the 2011 World Aquatics Championships. She left her coaching position in 2012 or 2013, probably due to her pregnancy.

References

1980 births
Living people
Chinese synchronized swimmers
Olympic bronze medalists for China
Olympic synchronized swimmers of China
Synchronized swimmers from Beijing
Synchronized swimmers at the 2000 Summer Olympics
Synchronized swimmers at the 2004 Summer Olympics
Synchronized swimmers at the 2008 Summer Olympics
Olympic medalists in synchronized swimming
Asian Games medalists in artistic swimming
Artistic swimmers at the 2002 Asian Games
Artistic swimmers at the 2006 Asian Games
Medalists at the 2008 Summer Olympics
World Aquatics Championships medalists in synchronised swimming
Synchronized swimmers at the 2009 World Aquatics Championships
Medalists at the 2002 Asian Games
Medalists at the 2006 Asian Games
Asian Games gold medalists for China
Asian Games silver medalists for China
Synchronized swimming coaches
20th-century Chinese women
21st-century Chinese women